Events in the year 2017 in Cyprus

Incumbents 
 President: Nicos Anastasiades
 President of the Parliament: Demetris Syllouris

Events 
Ongoing – Cyprus dispute

January 
 9 January – Greek and Turkish local leaders in the country resume talks to end the division of the island before a high level multilateral conference takes place in Geneva this week in the latest effort to reunify the island.
 13 January – Turkish President Recep Tayyip Erdoğan vows that the Turkish Armed Forces will stay on Cyprus "in perpetuity" and that the proposal of a rotating presidency for a unified island is unacceptable, casting doubts on an eventual solution to the dispute. The remarks come as the latest round of unity talks end, set to restart on January 18.

March 
 3 March – The European Parliament votes to end visa-free travel for U.S. citizens after the U.S. government failed to agree to visa-free travel for citizens of five E.U. member states, including Cyprus. The resolution is non-binding.

Deaths

References

 
2010s in Cyprus
Years of the 21st century in Cyprus
Cyprus
Cyprus
Cyprus